Chubb Island is a small barren island located in Manchester Bay in Beverly, Massachusetts.

History of the island remains largely unknown, though it is understood that the island received its name when explorers got a "chubb" upon seeing the island for the first time.

References

Beverly, Massachusetts
Islands of Essex County, Massachusetts
Uninhabited islands of Massachusetts